Junying Zhang , born 27 May 1976) is a road cyclist from China. She represented her nation at the 2004 Summer Olympics. She won at the 2004 Asian Cycling Championships the women's road race. She also rode at the 2003 UCI Road World Championships.

References

External links
 profile at Procyclingstats.com
 page at sports.sina.com.cn

1977 births
Chinese female cyclists
Living people
Cyclists at the 2004 Summer Olympics
Olympic cyclists of China